The Merchants' War may refer to:
 The Merchants' War (Pohl novel), by Frederik Pohl
 The Merchants' War (Stross novel), by Charles Stross